Smart Wheel is a Malaysian Tamil Language game show that were currently  broadcast on cable channel Astro Vinmeen HD. The first episode began airing on September 17, 2017, the show proved to be a hit for Astro Vinmeen HD. The show hosted by actor, Irfan Zaini.

Smart wheel is a game show that allows the contestants to win weekly cash prizes by answering General Knowledge (GE) and Intelligence Quotient (IQ) based questions in each of the episodes.

Game Format
16 brilliant undergraduates from various Institutes of Higher Learning will be joining this show. They will be competing with each other from 17 September 2017 to 7 January 2018 on a weekly basis to win each round. Then, they would be qualified into the Finals where they will stand a chance to win a total accumulated cash prize of RM 30,000 and a Brand New Proton Iriz!

Episode

References

2010s Malaysian television series
Tamil-language television shows